Moldova participated in the Eurovision Song Contest 2006 with the song "Loca" written by Arsenium. The song was performed by Arsenium and Natalia Gordienko featuring Connect-R. The Moldovan broadcaster TeleRadio-Moldova (TRM) organised the national final O melodie pentru Europa 2006 in order to select the Moldovan entry for the 2006 contest in Athens, Greece. An initial 40 entries competed to represent Moldova in Athens, with 13 being shortlisted to participate in the televised national final which took place on 25 February 2006. The combination of votes from a jury panel and a public televote resulted in a tie that was not resolved, and therefore a second final took place on 15 March 2006 with five entries participating. "Loca" performed by Arsenium and Natalia Gordienko featuring Connect-R emerged as the winner after gaining the most points following the combination of votes from the jury and public televote.

As one of the ten highest placed finishers in 2005, Moldova automatically qualified to compete in the final of the Eurovision Song Contest. Performing during the show in position 2, Moldova placed twentieth out of the 24 participating countries with 22 points.

Background 

Prior to the 2006 Contest, Moldova had participated in the Eurovision Song Contest one time since its first entry in 2005, with the song "Boonika bate doba" performed by Zdob și Zdub qualifiying Moldova to compete in the final and placing sixth. The Moldovan national broadcaster, TeleRadio-Moldova (TRM), broadcast the event within Moldova and organised the selection process for the nation's entry. TRM confirmed their intentions to participate at the 2006 Eurovision Song Contest on 6 January 2006. Moldova has selected their entry via a national selection show in 2005, a procedure that was continued for their 2006 participation.

Before Eurovision

O melodie pentru Europa 2006 
O melodie pentru Europa 2006 was the national final format developed by TRM in order to select Moldova's entry for the Eurovision Song Contest 2006. The event was to include a semi-final and a final to be held on 5 and 25 February 2006, respectively. However, a second final was held on 15 March 2006 after the first final ended without selecting a winner. All shows in the competition were broadcast on Moldova 1 and Radio Moldova as well as online via TRM's official website trm.md.

Format 
The selection of the competing entries for the national final and ultimately the Moldovan Eurovision entry took place over three rounds. The first round occurred on 30 January 2006 where a jury panel selected 25 semi-finalists from the received submissions to proceed to the second round, the televised national final. 25 semi-finalists competed in the semi-final on 5 February 2006. Thirteen songs qualified to the final based on the votes from an expert jury. The thirteen qualifying entries competed in the final on 25 February 2006 where the winner was selected based on the combined votes from an expert jury and public televoting results. In the event of a tie, the tie was resolved by an additional expert jury vote. Failing that, the entry that receives the vote from the youngest member of the jury would have been declared the winner. Since the jury was unable to select a winner following both tie-breaks, a second final took place on 15 March 2006 where five entries competed. The winner was selected by the 50/50 combination of an expert jury vote and a public televote. In the event of a tie, the tie would have been resolved by the youngest jury member's vote. Failing that, the entry that receives the highest score from the public televote would have been declared the winner.

Competing entries 
Artists and composers had the opportunity to submit their entries between 6 January 2006 and 27 January 2006. Songwriters were also required to submit a English and French version of the song lyrics. At the conclusion of the submission deadline, 40 valid entries out of 42 were received by the broadcaster; "Lumea dansează" performed by Gheorghe Olărescu was disqualified, while "Nu-mi jură" performed by Stela Mitriuc was withdrawn from the competition. A jury selected 25 semi-finalists out of the 40 received entries, which were announced on 31 January 2006.

Semi-final 
The semi-final took place on 5 February 2006 at TRM Studio 2 in Chișinău and aired on 8 February 2006. In the semi-final twenty-five acts competed and thirteen songs qualified to the final based on the votes of an expert jury.

First final
The final took place on 25 February 2006 at the Theatre of Opera and Ballet in Chișinău. Thirteen songs competed and the winner was selected based on the combination of a public televote and the votes of an expert jury. In addition to the performances of the competing entries, 2005 Moldovan Eurovision entrant Zdob și Zdub performed as a guest. At the conclusion of the voting, Geta Burlacu, Moldstar and Alexa, and Serj Kuzenkoff were tied at 18 points each. The tie was to be resolved with each member of the expert jury casting one vote for one of the three songs, which ended up with another tie as two of the entries received 4 votes each. The youngest jury member subsequently abstained from voting and therefore the final ended without a winner.

Second final 
On 8 March 2006, TRM announced the organisation of a second final; the rules of the competition stated that the broadcaster possessed the right to nullify the results of the selection and choose an alternative entry if they felt the overall standard was not good enough for the Eurovision Song Contest. Artists and composers had the opportunity to submit their entries until 14 March 2006, and the three artists tied for the first place in the first final were also invited by the broadcaster to compete with their initial songs; only Serj Kuzenkoff accepted the invitation. At the conclusion of the submission deadline, 8 valid entries were received by the broadcaster. A jury selected five out of the eight received entries to advance to the second final which took place on 15 March 2006 at the TRM Studio in Chișinău, hosted by Rusalina Rusu and Bogdan Dascal. The winner was selected based on the combination of a public televote and the votes of an expert jury. "Loca" performed by Arsenium featuring Natalia Gordienko and Connect-R was selected as the winner.

Controversy 
Following the 25 February final, producer of Moldstar and Alexa, Marian Stîrcea, criticised TRM of not complying to the regulations as it was decided to hold a second final instead of having the jury select from one of the three songs tied for first place as stated in the competition rules. On 2 March, producer of Millenium Vlad Gorgos presented a petition to the Government of Moldova in protest of the violation of rules as signed by 13 of the national final participants, whilst requesting a repeat of the first final with different jury members. Both had also accused the broadcaster of setting up Arsenium's eventual victory with Stîrcea calling for him to withdraw "in order to keep its name", and had claimed several violations in regards to the jury and televoting procedure that connected to rigging. TRM responded by clarifying that the all procedures were carried out correctly, and that the reason why no exact winner was announced during the first final was due to the failure of the jury tie-break procedure that led to a delay in the event's planned broadcasting time slot.

At Eurovision

According to Eurovision rules, all nations with the exceptions of the host country, the "Big Four" (France, Germany, Spain and the United Kingdom) and the ten highest placed finishers in the 2005 contest are required to qualify from the semi-final in order to compete for the final; the top ten countries from the semi-final progress to the final. As one of the ten highest placed finishers in the 2005 contest, Moldova automatically qualified to compete in the final on 20 May 2006. In addition to their participation in the final, Moldova is also required to broadcast and vote in the semi-final on 18 May 2006. On 21 March 2006, a special allocation draw was held which determined the running order and Moldova was set to perform in position 4 during the final, following the entry from Switzerland and before the entry from Israel. Moldova placed twentieth in the final, scoring 22 points. Following the contest, "Loca" gained success in Romania with the song reaching number four on the Romanian Top 100 in August 2006.

The two shows were televised in Moldova on Moldova 1 and broadcast via radio on Radio Moldova. All broadcasts featured commentary by Vitalie Rotaru. The Moldovan spokesperson, who announced the Moldovan votes during the final, was Svetlana Cocoş.

Voting 
Below is a breakdown of points awarded to Moldova and awarded by Moldova in the semi-final and grand final of the contest. The nation awarded its 12 points to Russia in the semi-final and to Romania in the final of the contest.

Points awarded to Moldova

Points awarded by Moldova

References

2006
Countries in the Eurovision Song Contest 2006
Eurovision